The Yamaha THR series is a line of small modeling guitar amplifiers meant for home use. THR stands for Third Amplifier.

Models 
 THR5
 THR5A
 THR10 (discontinued)
 THR10C (discontinued)
 THR10X (discontinued)
 THR10II
 THR10II Wireless
 THR30II Wireless
 THR30IIA Wireless (acoustic)

Yamaha products
Audio amplifiers